Drago Kovačević (1953 – November 27, 2019) was a Croatian Serb politician and writer. He lived in Belgrade, Serbia and worked for the Serbian Democratic Forum.

Biography
He was Minister of Information in Milan Babić's 1995 government of the separatist Republic of Serbian Krajina. He also succeeded Babić in the role of Mayor of Knin from 1994 to 1995 while it was part of the separatist republic. He later testified at Babić's trial before the International Criminal Tribunal for the former Yugoslavia.

Kovačević was a candidate for Čedomir Jovanović's electoral list in the 2012 and 2014 Serbian parliamentary elections.

He was a contributor to the weekly Novosti and the web portal Autograf.hr.

Works
Kavez, 2003
NK Dinara, Knin: 1913-2013; ni manjeg grada ni većeg kluba, 2013

References

1953 births
2019 deaths
People from Knin
Serbs of Croatia
Mayors of Knin
Serbian politicians
Serbian journalists